The Supplementary Convention on the Abolition of Slavery, the full title of which is the Supplementary Convention on the Abolition of Slavery, the Slave Trade, and Institutions and Practices Similar to Slavery, is a 1956 United Nations treaty which builds upon the 1926 Slavery Convention, which is still operative and which proposed to secure the abolition of slavery and of the slave trade, and the Forced Labour Convention of 1930, which banned forced or compulsory labour, by banning debt bondage, serfdom, child marriage, servile marriage, and child servitude.

Summary of key articles 
Article 1 – The parties commit to abolish and abandon debt bondage, serfdom, servile marriage and child servitude.

Article 2 – The parties commit to enacting minimum ages of marriage, encouraging registration of marriages, and encouraging the public declaration of consent to marriage.

Article 3 – Criminalisation of slave trafficking.

Article 4 – Runaway slaves who take refuge on flag vessels of parties shall thereby ipso facto attain their freedom.

Article 5 – Criminalisation of the marking (including mutilation and branding) of slaves and servile persons.

Article 6 – Criminalisation of enslavement and giving others into slavery.

Article 7 – Definitions of "slave", "a person of servile status" and "slave trade"

Article 9 – No reservations may be made to this Convention.

Article 12 – This Convention shall apply to all non-self-governing-trust, colonial and other non-metropolitan territories to the international relations of which any State Party is responsible.

See also

Anti-Slavery International
Contemporary slavery
Slavery in international law
Slave Trade Acts

References

External links
 Supplementary Convention on the Abolition of Slavery, the Slave Trade, and Institutions and Practices Similar to Slavery, 226 U.N.T.S. 3, entered into force 30 April 1957. Text of the Supplementary Convention on the Abolition of Slavery

International criminal law
United Nations treaties
Treaties concluded in 1956
Treaties entered into force in 1957
Supplementary Convention on the Abolition of Slavery
Supplementary Convention on the Abolition of Slavery

Treaties extended to the Aden Protectorate
Treaties of Algeria
Treaties extended to American Samoa
Treaties of Antigua and Barbuda
Treaties of Argentina
Treaties extended to Aruba
Treaties extended to Ashmore and Cartier Islands
Treaties extended to the Australian Antarctic Territory
Treaties of Australia
Treaties of Austria
Treaties of Azerbaijan
Treaties of the Bahamas
Treaties extended to Bahrain (protectorate)
Treaties of Bahrain
Treaties extended to Baker Island
Treaties of Bangladesh
Treaties of Barbados
Treaties extended to Basutoland
Treaties extended to the Bechuanaland Protectorate
Treaties of Belgium
Treaties extended to Bermuda
Treaties of Bolivia
Treaties of Bosnia and Herzegovina
Treaties of the military dictatorship in Brazil
Treaties extended to British Cyprus
Treaties extended to British Dominica
Treaties extended to the Gambia Colony and Protectorate
Treaties extended to British Guiana
Treaties extended to British Honduras
Treaties extended to British Hong Kong
Treaties extended to British Kenya
Treaties extended to the British Leeward Islands
Treaties extended to British Mauritius
Treaties extended to the British Solomon Islands
Treaties extended to British Somaliland
Treaties extended to the British Virgin Islands
Treaties extended to the British Windward Islands
Treaties extended to Brunei (protectorate)
Treaties of the Byelorussian Soviet Socialist Republic
Treaties of Cameroon
Treaties of Canada
Treaties of the Central African Republic
Treaties of Chile
Treaties extended to Christmas Island
Treaties extended to Clipperton Island
Treaties extended to the Cocos (Keeling) Islands
Treaties extended to the Colony of Fiji
Treaties extended to the Colony and Protectorate of Nigeria
Treaties extended to the Colony of Aden
Treaties extended to the Colony of Jamaica
Treaties extended to the Colony of Sierra Leone
Treaties extended to the Colony of the Bahamas
Treaties extended to the Cook Islands
Treaties extended to the Coral Sea Islands
Treaties of Croatia
Treaties extended to the Crown Colony of Seychelles
Treaties extended to the Crown Colony of Trinidad and Tobago
Treaties of Cuba
Treaties of Cyprus
Treaties of the Czech Republic
Treaties of Czechoslovakia
Treaties of Denmark
Treaties of Djibouti
Treaties of the Dominican Republic
Treaties of Dominica
Treaties of the Dominion of Ceylon
Treaties of East Germany
Treaties of Ecuador
Treaties of the Estado Novo (Portugal)
Treaties of the Ethiopian Empire
Treaties extended to the Falkland Islands
Treaties extended to the Faroe Islands
Treaties of the Federation of Malaya
Treaties extended to the Federation of Rhodesia and Nyasaland
Treaties of Fiji
Treaties of Finland
Treaties of France
Treaties of Francoist Spain
Treaties extended to French Comoros
Treaties extended to French Guiana
Treaties extended to French Polynesia
Treaties extended to French Somaliland
Treaties extended to the French Southern and Antarctic Lands
Treaties of Ghana
Treaties extended to Gibraltar
Treaties extended to the Gilbert and Ellice Islands
Treaties extended to Greenland
Treaties extended to Guadeloupe
Treaties extended to Guam
Treaties of Guatemala
Treaties extended to Guernsey
Treaties of Guinea
Treaties of Haiti
Treaties extended to Heard Island and McDonald Islands
Treaties extended to Howland Island
Treaties of the Hungarian People's Republic
Treaties of Iceland
Treaties of India
Treaties of the Iraqi Republic (1958–1968)
Treaties of Ireland
Treaties extended to the Isle of Man
Treaties of Israel
Treaties of Italy
Treaties of Ivory Coast
Treaties of Jamaica
Treaties extended to Jarvis Island
Treaties extended to Jersey
Treaties extended to Johnston Atoll
Treaties of Jordan
Treaties of Kazakhstan
Treaties of the Kingdom of Afghanistan
Treaties of the Kingdom of Cambodia (1953–1970)
Treaties of the Kingdom of Laos
Treaties of Kuwait
Treaties of Kyrgyzstan
Treaties of Latvia
Treaties of Lesotho
Treaties of the Libyan Arab Jamahiriya
Treaties of Luxembourg
Treaties of Madagascar
Treaties of Malawi
Treaties of Mali
Treaties extended to the Crown Colony of Malta
Treaties of Malta
Treaties extended to Martinique
Treaties of Mauritania
Treaties of Mauritius
Treaties extended to Mayotte
Treaties of Mexico
Treaties extended to Midway Atoll
Treaties of the Mongolian People's Republic
Treaties of Montenegro
Treaties extended to Montserrat
Treaties of Morocco
Treaties extended to the Nauru Trust Territory
Treaties extended to Navassa Island
Treaties of Nepal
Treaties extended to the Netherlands Antilles
Treaties extended to Netherlands New Guinea
Treaties of the Netherlands
Treaties extended to New Caledonia
Treaties extended to the New Hebrides
Treaties of New Zealand
Treaties of Nicaragua
Treaties of Nigeria
Treaties of Niger
Treaties extended to Niue
Treaties extended to Norfolk Island
Treaties extended to the Colony of North Borneo
Treaties of Norway
Treaties of Pahlavi Iran
Treaties of Pakistan
Treaties extended to Palmyra Atoll
Treaties extended to the Panama Canal Zone
Treaties of Paraguay
Treaties of the People's Republic of Bulgaria
Treaties of the People's Socialist Republic of Albania
Treaties of the Philippines
Treaties of the Polish People's Republic
Treaties extended to Portuguese Macau
Treaties extended to Puerto Rico
Treaties extended to Qatar (protectorate)
Treaties of North Macedonia
Treaties of the Republic of the Congo
Treaties of the Republic of the Sudan (1956–1969)
Treaties extended to Réunion
Treaties of Rwanda
Treaties extended to Saint Helena, Ascension and Tristan da Cunha
Treaties of Saint Lucia
Treaties extended to Saint Pierre and Miquelon
Treaties of Saint Vincent and the Grenadines
Treaties of San Marino
Treaties of Saudi Arabia
Treaties of Senegal
Treaties of Serbia and Montenegro
Treaties of Seychelles
Treaties extended to the Sheikhdom of Kuwait
Treaties of Sierra Leone
Treaties of Singapore
Treaties of Slovakia
Treaties of Slovenia
Treaties of the Socialist Republic of Romania
Treaties of the Solomon Islands
Treaties of the Soviet Union
Treaties extended to the Sultanate of Zanzibar
Treaties extended to Surinam (Dutch colony)
Treaties of Suriname
Treaties extended to Swaziland (protectorate)
Treaties of Sweden
Treaties of Switzerland
Treaties extended to Tanganyika (territory)
Treaties of Tanganyika
Treaties extended to the Territory of Alaska
Treaties extended to the Territory of Hawaii
Treaties extended to the Territory of Papua and New Guinea
Treaties extended to the Colony of Sarawak
Treaties of the Kingdom of Greece
Treaties of Togo
Treaties extended to Tokelau
Treaties extended to the Kingdom of Tonga (1900–1970)
Treaties of Trinidad and Tobago
Treaties extended to the Trucial States
Treaties extended to the Trust Territory of Somalia
Treaties extended to the Trust Territory of the Pacific Islands
Treaties of Tunisia
Treaties of Turkey
Treaties of Turkmenistan
Treaties extended to the Uganda Protectorate
Treaties of Uganda
Treaties of the Ukrainian Soviet Socialist Republic
Treaties of the United Arab Republic
Treaties of the United Kingdom
Treaties extended to the United States Virgin Islands
Treaties of the United States
Treaties of Uruguay
Treaties extended to Wake Island
Treaties extended to Wallis and Futuna
Treaties extended to West Berlin
Treaties of West Germany
Treaties of Yugoslavia
Treaties of Zaire
Treaties of Zambia
Treaties of Zimbabwe
September 1956 events